Love and the Frenchwoman is the US title of a 1960 French anthology film originally entitled La française et l'amour. It starred Jean-Paul Belmondo and Dany Robin.

The movie was a big hit in France with admissions of 3,056,736.

Cast

1 - L'Enfance  
 Pierre-Jean Vaillard : Monsieur Eugène Bazouche
 Jacqueline Porel : Madame Bazouche
 Darry Cowl : le professeur Dufieux
 Noël Roquevert : Colonel Chappe 
 Jacques Duby : Victor
 Paulette Dubost : Madame Tronche 
 Micheline Dax : Mademoiselle Lulu

2 - L'Adolescence  
 Sophie Desmarets : Lucienne Martin, la mère
 Pierre Mondy : Édouard Martin, le père
 Annie Sinigalia : Bichette Martin, la fille
 Roger Pierre : le prince charmant
 François Nocher : Jacques
 Pierre-Louis : le médecin
 Simone Paris : la dame à la soirée
 Jean Desailly : la voix du speaker

3 - La Virginité  
 Valérie Lagrange : Ginette
 Pierre Michael : François
 Nicole Chollet : la mère de Ginette
 Marie-Thérèse Orain : une coiffeuse
 Joëlle Latour : une coiffeuse
 Charles Bouillaud : l'hôtelier
 Pascal Mazzotti : le coiffeur
 Paul Bonifas : le père de Ginette

4 - Le Mariage  
 Claude Rich : Charles, le marié
 Marie-José Nat : Line, la mariée
 Yves Robert : le moustachu
 Jacques Fabbri : le porteur SNCF
 Jacques Marin : le contrôleur SNCF

5 - L'Adultère  
 Dany Robin : Nicole
 Paul Meurisse : Jean-Claude
 Jean-Paul Belmondo : Gilles
 Claude Piéplu : Monsieur Berton-Marsac, l'homme d'affaires
 Bernard Musson : le serveur
  Kessler Twins :   maîtresses de Jean-Claude

6 - Le Divorce   
 François Périer : Michel
 Annie Girardot : Danielle
 Denise Grey : la mère de Danielle
 Jean Poiret : un avocat
 Michel Serrault : un avocat
 Francis Blanche : le juge Marceroux
 Alfred Adam : l'ami de Michel
 Georges Chamarat : le juge

7 - La Femme seule  
Based on a short story by Marcel Aymé
 Robert Lamoureux : Désiré
 Martine Carol : Éliane
 Silvia Monfort : Gilberte
 Simone Renant : l'avocate
 Robert Rollis : le joueur de ping-pong
 Suzanne Nivette : Mademoiselle Mangebois
 Paul Villé : le président du tribunal

References

External links
Review of film at New York Times
Love and the Frenchwoman at TCMDB

1960 films
French anthology films
Films scored by Georges Delerue
Films based on works by Marcel Aymé
Films with screenplays by Michel Audiard
1960s French films